Flor Silvestre, vol. 7 is a studio album by Mexican singer Flor Silvestre, released in 1968 by Musart Records. It features the Mariachi México and the Mariachi Los Mensajeros.

Track listing
Side one

Side two

Personnel
 Mariachi México – accompaniment
 Mariachi Los Mensajeros – accompaniment

External links
 Flor Silvestre, vol. 7 at AllMusic

1968 albums
Flor Silvestre albums
Musart Records albums
Spanish-language albums